Kavirat Rural District may refer to:

Kavirat Rural District (Isfahan Province)
Kavirat Rural District (Kerman Province)